Laura Groves, an English musician originally from Shipley, West Yorkshire, England. Her debut album, Blue Roses, was released in 2009 on XL Recordings under the alias Blue Roses. Groves now lives in London and is releasing music under her own name. The Thinking about Thinking EP came out in 2013, followed by the Committed Language EP in February 2015 and the EP A Private Road in 2020. Laura Groves and her band played a string of dates in support of Elbow and Glass Animals.

Discography

Albums
 Blue Roses (XL/Salvia, 2009)

EPs
 Doubtful Comforts (XL, 2009)
 Does Anyone Love Me Now? (XL, 2009)
 Thinking About Thinking (DEEK, 2013)
 Committed Language (DEEK, 2015)
 A Private Road (Bella Union, 2020)

Singles
 "I Am Leaving" (XL/Salvia, 2007)
 "Courtyard" (self-released, 2020)
 "Friday" (live) (self-released, 2020)
 "Inky Sea" (live) (self-released, 2020)

References

External links
 Official website

Living people
English women singer-songwriters
English women guitarists
English guitarists
Musicians from Yorkshire
People from Shipley, West Yorkshire
XL Recordings artists
21st-century English women singers
21st-century English singers
1987 births